Yonibana is a small rural town in Tonkolili District in the Northern Province of Sierra Leone. It is the centre of the Yoni Chiefdom The vast majority of its population are from the Temne ethnic group and the Temne language is widely spoken in the town. Yonibana lies approximately 28.2 miles to the district capital Magburaka and approximately 90 miles north-east of Freetown. 

The town is best known for being home to its dynamic Poro secret society. Yonibana is served by the Yonibana Secondary School, one of the oldest Secondary schools in Northern Sierra Leone, built in 1964. 

Yonibana is the birthplace of Sierra Leone's minister of Health Haja Zainab Hawa Bangura; and former Sierra Leone's foreign minister from 2002 to 2007 Momodu Koroma.

Northern Province, Sierra Leone
Populated places in Sierra Leone